Gerd Mjøen Brantenberg (born October 27, 1941) is a Norwegian author, teacher, and feminist writer.

Biography
Brantenberg was born in Oslo, but grew up in Fredrikstad. She studied English, History, and Sociology in London, Edinburgh, and Oslo. She has an English hovedfag (main subject, comparable to a Master), from the University of Oslo, where she also studied history and political science. She worked as a lector in Norwegian and Danish high schools, and she also held positions at the trade union for lectors (Norsk Lektorlag) and the Norwegian Authors' Union. 

She worked from 1972 to 1983 in the Women's House in Oslo. She was a board member of the Norway's first association for homosexual people Forbundet av 1948, the precursor to the Norwegian National Association for Lesbian and Gay Liberation. She has established women's shelters and has worked in Lesbisk bevegelse (Lesbian movement) in both Oslo and Copenhagen. In 1978, she founded a literary Women's Forum with the purpose of encouraging women to write and publish. 

Since 1982, she has been a writer full-time. She has published 10 novels, 2 plays, 2 translations, and many political songs, and has contributed to numerous anthologies. Her most famous novel is Egalias døtre ("The Daughters of Egalia"), which was published in 1977 in Norway. In the novel, the female is defined as the normal and the male as the abnormal, subjugated sex. All words that are normally in masculine form are given in a feminine form, and vice versa. 

In the 1970s, Brantenberg was in a lesbian partnership with the Danish writer Vibeke Vasbo who joined her in Oslo in 1974.

She is the cousin of radio and TV entertainer Lars Mjøen.

Awards and honours
She was awarded the Mads Wiel Nygaards Endowment in 1983. In 1986 she was awarded the Danish literary prize "Thitprisen", named after the Danish author Thit Jensen.

Publications
Novels that have been published in English:
 What Comes Naturally (London, 1986)
 Egalia's Daughters, (Seattle 1986) or The Daughters of Egalia (London 1985)
 The Four Winds (Seattle, 1996).

References

External links 
 http://skrift.no/brantenberg/ (Biography in Norwegian)
 https://web.archive.org/web/20020224024416/http://www.dagbladet.no/kontekst/15753.html (Biography in Dagbladet, Norwegian Newspaper)

1941 births
Living people
Norwegian feminists
Feminist writers
Norwegian educators
University of Oslo alumni
Alumni of the University of Edinburgh
Norwegian LGBT rights activists
Norwegian LGBT novelists
Lesbian feminists
Lesbian novelists
Writers from Oslo
People from Fredrikstad
20th-century Norwegian novelists
21st-century Norwegian novelists
Norwegian women novelists
Norwegian lesbian writers
21st-century Norwegian women writers
20th-century Norwegian women writers